Betley is a village and civil parish in the Newcastle district of Staffordshire, England, about halfway between Newcastle-under-Lyme and Nantwich.  Betley forms a continual linear settlement with Wrinehill.

School
Betley School

Transport
Betley lies on the A531 from Madeley to Weston. There is an hourly bus service, run by  D&G Bus (route 85 ) which runs through Betley from Hanley and Newcastle-under-Lyme to Crewe and Nantwich.

History
Betley - meaning the 'clearing in the woods' of Bette (a Saxon woman's name) - is an ancient settlement. It is mentioned in the Domesday Book. It is one of several villages - including Buddileigh, Audley, and Madeley - which seem to be named after women. It had a major market, the charter for which was granted in the thirteenth century. At Betley Hall, a now-demolished country house, Charles Darwin conducted some of his zoological observations and Florence Nightingale visited. At another country house in the village, Betley Court (which is still standing), lived the Romantic poet Elizabeth Tollet. The church, dedicated to St Margaret of Antioch, is a beautiful medieval building (reasonably well-restored by George Gilbert Scott), with oak beams and a cricket ground to the rear.

See also 
 Betley Court

Nearest places
Nantwich

Twin towns

Betley is twinned with:
 Agny, France

See also
Listed buildings in Betley

References

Sources
Betley: A Village of Contrasts, ed. Robert Speake (Keele University, 1980).

External links

Betley Local History Society
Betley Local History Information
Parish Council Community Website
Betley Village Hall Website
St Margaret's Church Website

Villages in Staffordshire
Borough of Newcastle-under-Lyme